Margaret Anwen Butten (born 29 August 1972 in Carmarthen) is a Welsh international Bowls competitor for Wales.

Bowls career
Her passion for bowls began at the age of 13 after watching her Mother play for the Welsh International team.  Seeing her mother play inspired her to play.

At the 2002 Commonwealth Games she won a bronze medal along with Joanna Weale in the women's pairs event. Butten competed at the 2006 Commonwealth Games in Melbourne but was unsuccessful in winning a medal.

In 2007 she won the triples silver medal at the Atlantic Bowls Championships and followed this with a fours gold medal in Johannesburg two years later (2009).

She then competed at the 2010 Commonwealth Games along with Hannah Smith in the women's pairs and won a bronze medal.

During the run up to the 2014 Commonwealth Games in Glasgow she was chosen for the Commonwealth Games Queen's Baton Relay in Carmarthen.  The Baton carried a message from Queen Elizabeth II as Head of the Commonwealth. The Relay traditionally begins at Buckingham Palace in London as a part of the city's Commonwealth Day festivities. The Queen entrusts the baton to the first relay runner. At the Opening Ceremony of the Games, held at Glasgow's Celtic F.C. stadium, the final relay runner, Chris Hoy, handed the baton back to the Queen, who read the message aloud to officially open the Games.

She won another medal at the 2015 Atlantic Games before winning a silver medal with Kathy Pearce and Emma Woodcock in the triples at the 2016 World Outdoor Bowls Championship in Christchurch.

She was selected as part of the Welsh team for the 2018 Commonwealth Games on the Gold Coast in Queensland

In 2019 she won the fours gold medal at the Atlantic Bowls Championships and in 2020 she was selected for the 2020 World Outdoor Bowls Championship in Australia.

In 2022, she competed in the women's triples and the Women's fours at the 2022 Commonwealth Games.

References

External links 
 

1972 births
Living people
Welsh female bowls players
Welsh sportswomen
Commonwealth Games medallists in lawn bowls
Commonwealth Games bronze medallists for Wales
Bowls players at the 2002 Commonwealth Games
Bowls players at the 2010 Commonwealth Games
Bowls players at the 2022 Commonwealth Games
Medallists at the 2002 Commonwealth Games
Medallists at the 2010 Commonwealth Games